= Rozalia Kochkovska =

Macedonian judge

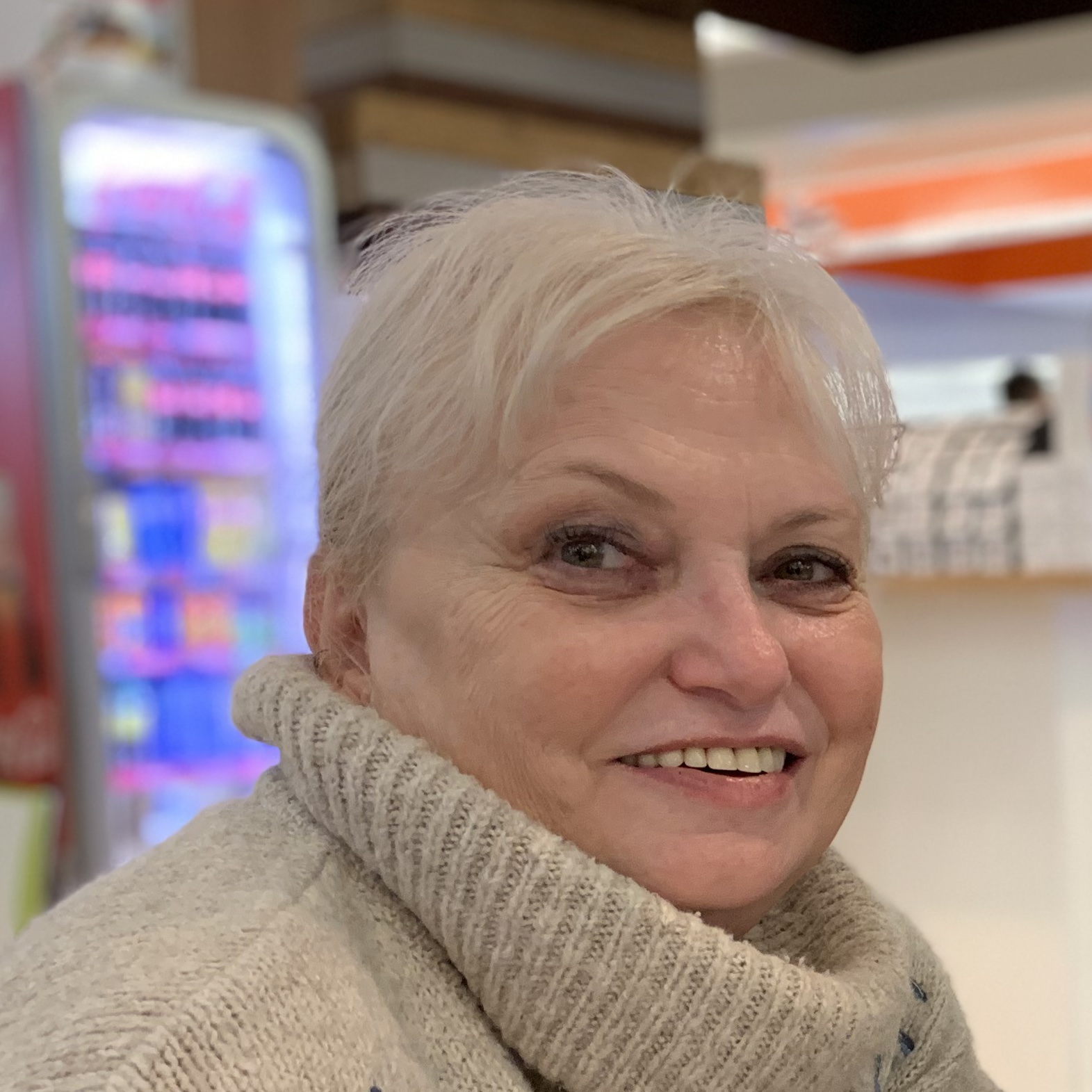
- Born: 27 April 1953; Skopje, Yugoslavia
- Died: 18 December 2024 (aged 71); Skopje, North Macedonia
- Occupation: Judge
- Known for: Inaugural president of the Administrative Court, president of the Higher Administrative Court

Rozalia Kochkovska (Note: The name is sometimes transliterated as Rozalija Kockovska in English sources, but the correct spelling is Rozalia Kochkovska. Likewise in Cyrillic languages, the name is sometimes referred as Розалија Кочковска, but the correct spelling is Розалиа Кочковска.) (Macedonian: Розалиа Кочковска; 27 April 1953 – 18 December 2024) was a Macedonian judge who served as the inaugural president of the Administrative Court and later as president of the Higher Administrative Court of the Republic of Macedonia.

== Early life and education ==
Rozalia Kochkovska was born on 27 April 1953 in Skopje, Socialist Republic of Macedonia. She graduated from the Faculty of Law in 1977 and passed her judicial exam in 1979, laying the groundwork for her judicial career in Macedonia.

== Career ==
Rozalia Kochkovska began her career as a judicial trainee at the District Commercial Court in Skopje, later serving as a professional associate at both the District Commercial Court and the Supreme Court of Macedonia. From 1987 to 2007, she was a judge at the Basic Court Skopje I.

In 2007, she was elected as a judge and the first president of the newly established Administrative Court in Skopje, playing a key role in its formation under the 2006 Law on Administrative Disputes, part of Macedonia's judicial reforms aligned with European Union standards. "Introducing the Legal System of North Macedonia".

In 2011, Rozalia Kochkovska was appointed president of the Higher Administrative Court, overseeing appeals in administrative disputes.

== Death ==
Rozalia Kochkovska died on 18 December 2024 in Skopje, North Macedonia, at the age of 71.
